The Nine O'Clock Service was a youth-orientated alternative Christian worship service started in 1986 at St Thomas' Church in Crookes, Sheffield, England, by a group of musicians and artists. The service and the group associated with it grew to national prominence, but the service was stopped in 1995 following allegations of sexual and emotional abuse.

Origins
Beginning as a simple alternative format service under the leadership of Chris Brain, the group responsible for it developed a leadership structure that was endorsed by the leadership of St Thomas' Church. The average age of the members was 24 for much of NOS's life. The membership was significantly from non-church backgrounds.

Starting with about 10 people who worked on designing and creating the services, the congregation grew to almost 600 members while resident at St Thomas' Church. Main themes included care for the planet and concern about its abuse, simple lifestyle and development of relationships with non-churched people.

By 1988, David Lunn, then Bishop of Sheffield, sanctioned a move to a new site at Ponds Forge Rotunda in the centre of Sheffield. Around the same time, Chris Brain underwent training to be ordained as a priest in the Church of England. The Planetary Mass at Pond's Forge was marked by both bold liturgical experimentation and naive hopefulness. The suspended Roman Catholic priest and American Dominican theologian Matthew Fox was consulted.

Demise
The number of community members stopped growing and service attendance plateaued at about 300. A significant practical weakness in terms of duty of care was the lack of accountability for NOS and its absence from diocesan accountability. This was allowed because of its perceived international significance, which in the end came to nothing. Plans for communities elsewhere were in talks.

In 1995, a number of complaints began to surface of the sexual abuse of women in the group by Chris Brain. After an investigation by the Diocese of Sheffield, the group was shut down in August 1995. The Bishop of Sheffield demanded Brain's resignation after he confessed to having sexual relationships with young women in the congregation. There were also calls from former members of the congregation that he be defrocked. The Archbishop of York banned Brain from acting as an ordained priest. Initially refusing to step down, Brain eventually resigned in November 1995, the week before a documentary on the abuse scandal was aired. He then checked himself into a psychiatric hospital. The Diocese of Sheffield, through a seconded pastoral team led by Rachel Ross, the Reverend Andrew Teal and the Reverend Peter Craig-Wild, attempted to manage the pastoral care both of Brain and members of the community wounded by the scandal.  A remnant of the community continued to meet, under different leadership, for some years afterwards in Sheffield.

Books

References

Christianity in Sheffield
1986 establishments in England
1995 disestablishments in England